Henry Bruce may refer to:
Henry Bruce (Royal Navy officer, born 1792) (1792–1863), British admiral
Henry Bruce, 1st Baron Aberdare (1815–1895), British statesman
Henry Bruce, 2nd Baron Aberdare (1851–1929), his son
Sir Henry Bruce (Royal Navy officer) (1862–1948), British admiral
Henry Bruce (Australian politician) (1884–1958), Queensland and Federal Australian politician
Henry Brudenell-Bruce, 5th Marquess of Ailesbury (1842–1911), British soldier and politician
Sir Henry Bruce, 3rd Baronet (1820–1907), Member of Parliament for Coleraine 1862–1874 and 1880–1885
Henry Bruce (priest) (1788–1822), Irish priest
Henry James Bruce (1880–1951), British diplomat and author

See also
Harry Bruce (disambiguation)